Gro is a feminine Norwegian given name. Notable people with the name include:

 Gró, a figure in Norse mythology
 Gro Brækken (born 1952), Norwegian businessperson
 Gro Harlem Brundtland (born 1939), Norwegian politician
 Gro Pedersen Claussen (born 1941), Norwegian graphic designer
 Gro Dahle (born 1962), Norwegian writer
 Gro Espeseth (born 1972), Norwegian footballer
 Gro Gulden (born 1939), Norwegian mycologist
 Gro Hagemann (born 1945), Norwegian historian
 Gro Holm (born 1958), Norwegian news editor and correspondent
 Gro Marit Istad Kristiansen (born 1978), Norwegian biathlete
 Gro Kvinlog (born 1976), Norwegian skier
 Gro Møllerstad (born 1960), Norwegian businessperson
 Gro Sandvik (born 1942), Norwegian flautist
 Gro Anita Schønn (1950–2001), Norwegian singer
 Gro Skartveit (born 1965), Norwegian politician
 Gro Steinsland (born 1945), Norwegian historian
 Gro Hillestad Thune (born 1943), Norwegian jurist

References

Norwegian feminine given names